Ashar Char is a two mile long island in the western Bay of Bengal, located along the path of the Pyra river in the Amtali Upazila, Barguna District of Bangladesh.

Population
In the past thousands of people lived on Ashar Char, but the island has been shrinking, and only a few hundred live there currently. The island was devastated by Cyclone Sidr in 2007. It is estimated that more than a thousand people died during the cyclone.

See also

 List of islands of Bangladesh

References

Barguna District
Islands of Bangladesh
Former islands of Bangladesh
Islands of the Bay of Bengal
Populated places in Bangladesh